This is a list of Jupiter trojans that lie in the Greek camp, an elongated curved region around the leading Lagrangian point, 60° ahead of Jupiter in its orbit.

All the asteroids at Jupiter's  point have names corresponding to participants on the Greek side of the Trojan War, except for 624 Hektor, which was named before this naming convention was instituted. Correspondingly, 617 Patroclus is a Greek-named  asteroid at the "Trojan" Lagrangian point. In 2018, at its 30th General Assembly in Vienna, the International Astronomical Union amended this naming convention, allowing for Jupiter trojans with H larger than 12 (that is, a mean diameter smaller than approximately 22 kilometers, for an assumed albedo of 0.057) to be named after Olympic athletes, as the number of known Jupiter trojans, currently more than 10,000, far exceeds the number of available names of heroes from the Trojan War in Greek mythology.

Trojans in the Greek and Trojan camp are discovered mainly in turns, because they are separated by 120°, and for a period of time one group of trojans will be behind the Sun, and the other will be visible.

Partial lists 
, there are 6506 known objects in the Greek camp, of which 3264 are numbered and listed in the following partial lists:
 List of Jupiter trojans (Greek camp) (1–100000)
 List of Jupiter trojans (Greek camp) (100001–200000)
 List of Jupiter trojans (Greek camp) (200001–300000)
 List of Jupiter trojans (Greek camp) (300001–400000)
 List of Jupiter trojans (Greek camp) (400001–500000)
 List of Jupiter trojans (Greek camp) (500001–600000)
 List of Jupiter trojans (Greek camp) (600001–700000)

Largest members 
This is a list of the largest 100+ Jupiter trojans of both the Greek and Trojan camps.

References 
 

 
Jupiter trojans (Greek camp)
Lists of Jupiter trojans